Calamar is a town and municipality in the Guaviare Department, Colombia.

Ten former members of Revolutionary Armed Forces of Colombia (FARC) were killed in a military bombing on Calamar on March 3, 2021. Three “dissidents” are captured.

References

Municipalities of Guaviare Department